Ghudda is a large village located in the district of Bathinda in the state of Punjab in India. In the 2011 census it had a population of 5320 persons living in 1023 households. It was founded, in later half of 17th century, by Baba Ghudda, whose ancestors shifted from village Sur Singh(Wala) near Tarn Taaran, to Village Wanger near Talwandi Sabo, the then Lakhi Jungle area of Punjab. Ghudda was "a sleeping village" of the erstwhile Jungle Des.  Ghudda is inhabited by persons of many castes and creeds. Ghudda is also a village of ancestors of Prakash Singh Badal. Now Ghudda is one of the most developed village of Bathinda district.

Recent developments
From an obscure village with dusty streets in the hinterland of the Malwa region, Ghudda is now being transformed into a township with modern infrastructure as the Central University of Punjab (CUPB) and several other prestigious educational and technical institutions are coming up in its neighborhood.

A piece of 562 acres of land has been acquired for the CUP. Construction of the University College at a cost of Rs 12 crores (INR) is in full swing. The other institutions that are coming up are the Sports School, Horse Riding Institute of the Remount and Veterinary Wing of the NCC, Veterinary Pharmacist College and a 50-bed Hospital.

The area is getting transformed into a hub of academics and sports.  The area is being given a magnificent look by widening the nearly 30-km double lane road leading here from Bathinda. The village panchayat of Ghudda has suddenly become rich as it has earned an amount of Rs 5.10 crores (INR) by way of giving its land for the CUP.

Under the new development plan, the dusty streets in the village would get an interlocking pavement and a proper drainage system. The village would also have a separate sewerage system so that any visitor to the CUP or any other institute finds a pleasant environment.

A sum of Rs 58 lakhs (INR) has been earmarked for premix blacktopping of roads. Every household would have piped supply of drinking water. A sports school is being established by the government to train the youngsters and restore Punjab's leading position in the field of sports. The Sports School would have six playgrounds including two each for basketball and volleyball, football, hockey and an athletic track that would cost about Rs 45 lakhs (INR).

The AstroTurf for Hockey  and Synthetic Athletic Track is estimated to be set up at a cost Rs 10.15 crores (INR). Besides, an Indoor Stadium is also being constructed at a cost of Rs 4.29 crores.

Construction of the 5336 square feet horse stable of the riding school is also in progress.

Economy
Agriculture is the primary occupation of the residents. The opening up of CUP has brought a plethora of other jobs to the place with banking and education being other means of employment. With the emergence of University College Ghudda and Sports School, Ghudda, students move here in bulk and small restaurants and other grocery stores came into existence which have boosted the economy of village. Services like tiffin and paying guests etc. have been started in village and has also become a source of livelihood of people. Manual Jobs have created in bunch because of construction work of CUP in village.

Education
Ghudda is known for Central University of Punjab. After the inception of central university of Punjab, many educational institutions have been opened in village. "Sports School, Ghudda" is very famous sports school across the state. Many students of Sports school Ghudda have represented Punjab in national games. Punjab University, Patiala has also opened here college called "University College Ghudda". There are another good convent schools in village which makes Ghudda educational hub.
List of Educational Institutions in Village Ghudda

Central University of Punjab

University College Ghudda

Sports School Ghudda

Govt. Senior Secondary Smart School, Ghudda

Wheat Field convent school. Ghudda

Different Convent school, Ghudda

Stoneway Convent School, Ghudda

Sumeet Volleyball Academy, Ghudda

Punjab Institute of Technology (3 km from Village)

Martyrs
People of Ghudda have been serving in Indian Army since World War-I. Bhag Singh from Ghudda martyred on 6 May 1915 during the Gallipoli Campaign in Second Battle of Krithia, serving in 14th King George's Own Ferozepore Sikhs and his name has been scribed on Helles Memorial, Turkey . Around 5-6 person of this village fought in 1971 war. Two young person martyred in Bangladesh during war of 1971 in Mukti Wahini Campaign led by Gen. Harbaksh Singh. 
One person martyred in an ambush by Pakisthani militants in kashmir. 
Martyrs's Gate, commemorating martyrs of this village has been constructed on entry of village and one park on the name of martyrs is developed. Nowadays, dozens of Youngsters are serving Indian army.

Local government
Village has a Panchayat with Seema Rani Goyal being the incumbent sarpanch.

Name List of Ex Sarpanchs

Sukhmander singh kala 2013-2018

Ranjodh singh Dhillon 2009-2013

Post was vacant for one year due to court stay 2008-2009

Jagg singh 2003-2008

Ajaib singh Dhillon 1998-2003

Hardev Singh Dhillon 1993-1998

Jaswant Singh Tiwana 1983-1993 (Term was extended due to militancy in Punjab)

Surjit Singh Dhillion  1978-1983

Kaur Singh Tiwana 1973-1978

Jaswant Singh Dhillion 1968-1973

Sohan Ram Goyal 1963-1968

Arjun Singh 1952-1963

Sports
After the inception of Sports School at this village, many students got in sports school and grabbed top positions in state level and national level competitions of Boxing, Shooting and wrestling.

References

External links
 Central University of Punjab Bathinda 
 University of Punjab

Villages in Bathinda district